Copiapoa cinerea is a species of plant in the genus Copiapoa in the family Cactaceae. The epithet cinerea comes from the Latin word for ash, by reference to the colour of the epidermis.

It comes from the region of Antofagasta and the coastal zones of northern Chile. The area is very arid. However, there are dense fogs, due to cold streams of the Pacific Ocean.

The ash-grey to white coloured epidermis contrasts with typically black spines and woolly crown when adult.

Description
Only old plants offset from the base.

The light coloration is a protection against desiccation. In culture, the epidermis is often greenish.

Cultivation
Copiapoa cinerea is slow growing and hard to keep, because of the risk of rotting. Grafting is a solution. It rarely flowers in cultivation.
Before all, it needs well drained soils. Sunny place, but protection against excessive sun in summer.
In summer, it needs light and regular watering, but let the soil dry between two waterings.
In winter, keep warm (no less than 8 °C) and absolutely dry.

Synonyms

 Echinocactus cinereus

References

Sources

External links
 
 
  photos on www.cactiguide.com
  http://www.cactus-art.biz/schede/COPIAPOA/Copiapoa_cinerea/Copiapoa_cinerea/Copiapoa_cinerea.htm

Cacti of South America
Endemic flora of Chile
Flora of northern Chile
Atacama Desert
Plants described in 1922
Cactoideae